Shchaslyve is a village in Boryspil Raion, Kyiv Oblast that borders Kyiv city. It hosts the administration of Prystolychna rural hromada, one of the hromadas of Ukraine. Along with a settlement Prolisky, it composes the Shchaslyve rural council which is the biggest council in the district.

The village and the council are located along the Kyiv-Kharkiv highway M03 on the way to the Boryspil International Airport.

The village contains sports facility  and used to house the FC Knyazha Shchaslyve. Since 2014 in Shchaslyve plays the FC Arsenal-Kyiv.

The village was created in 1969 as part of Bortnychi state farm. Today Bortnychi is a neighborhood of Kyiv city.

References

External links
 Village website
 Profile at the Verkhovna Rada website

Villages in Boryspil Raion